Sikkim National Congress ( SNC) was a political party in the Kingdom of Sikkim. It was founded in 1962, through a merger of Swatantra Dal, Rajya Praja Sammelan, and dissidents of the then dominant parties, Sikkim State Congress and Sikkim National Party. Kazi Lhendup Dorjee was its leader.

The SNC was formed to be a party representing all ethnic groups in Sikkim, as the previously dominating parties were divided on ethnic lines. It opposed the monarchy in Sikkim and worked for democratic reforms.

In April 1973, Sikkim Janata Congress merged with SNC. In 1974, the first democratically elected government took office in Sikkim. In that election, the party won 31 out of 32 seats.

After the merger of Sikkim with India in 1975, the party merged with the Indian National Congress.

Electoral history

References 

.

Defunct political parties in Sikkim
1962 establishments in Sikkim
Political parties established in 1962
Political parties disestablished in 1977
1977 disestablishments in India